Meï Teï Shô is a French music band playing jazz, afrobeat, and dub.

Band's name 

Meï Teï Shô

Musical description 

Meï Teï Sho is a music to listen to as well as a music to dance to.
It is the fruit of a multitude of cultures, reflected in the languages used, the lyrics, the style, the energy and the musicians themselves.
Based on a repetitive pattern, the musicians add improvisations, instrumentals and vocals, producing this energetic musical style.

Biography

Members 
 Bruce Sherfield : singing 
 Eric Teruel : Fender Rhodes 
 Jean-Phi Chalte : machines 
 Germain Samba : drums 
 Boris Kulenovic : Bass guitar

Discography 
 Maxi (2000)
 Xam Sa Bop (2001)
 Live (2002)
 Remix  mini LP (2002)
 Lô Bâ (2004)

External links 
 Myspace

French musical groups